Events DC is the official convention, sports and entertainment authority for the District of Columbia. Events DC is a quasi-public company based in Washington, D.C. that owns and manages the Walter E. Washington Convention Center, Entertainment & Sports Arena, the RFK Stadium Campus, and Nationals Park among other DC venues. It also promotes, sponsors and attracts sporting and cultural events to the District.

History
The Washington Sports and Convention Authority (WSCA) was formed on October 1, 2009 following the merger of the Washington Convention Center Authority (WCCA) and the D.C. Sports and Entertainment Commission (DCSEC). The plan was announced by D.C. Mayor Adrian Fenty as a cost saving measure in his 2010 budget proposal. In 2011, the WSCA was renamed Events DC to align with the other brands of the District and its tourism arm, Destination DC.

Leadership
Samuel Thomas currently serves as the interm president and CEO of Events DC following the departure of former President and CEO Greg O'Dell in March 2022. The board is chaired by Max Brown, a businessman and lobbyist for Zipcar, CSX Corporation and Corizon Health who previously served as legal counsel and deputy chief of staff to Anthony Williams. Brown is also an investor and lobbyist in esports at the same time that EventsDC started a large esports initiative.

Operations
Events DC receives more than $100 million in taxpayer money but has an independent board appointed by the Mayor.   In addition to overseeing the Convention Center, Nationals Park, RFK Stadium, St. Elizabeths East Entertainment and Sports Arena, and the D.C. Armory, it has provided funding to various construction and development projects in the District. It provided more than $200 million in public money into construction of the Marriott Marquis convention center hotel and acquired the rights to the Carnegie Library. In 2017 and 2018, Events DC spent $150,000 to unsuccessfully lobby Congress to give the District greater authority over RFK Stadium, which could enable the Washington Commanders to return to DC. Events DC also oversees a community grants program which awards deserving non-profit organizations with grants each year. In 2022, Events DC awarded 39 local nonprofits grants totaling $500,000.

Convention center and hotel
As part of the $520 million construction of the Marriott Marquis which opened in 2014, Events DC expected an increase in citywide conventions. DC hosted 22 conventions in 2011 but only 15 in 2015 and 2016. In October 2015, the DC auditor called on Events DC to increase profitability of the Convention Center after it fell below the average revenues and higher expenses per square foot of 13 other large convention centers studied.

Events DC was responsible for training staff to work at the Marriot Marquis, which had a requirement of hiring district residents for 51 percent of the hotel's staff as a condition of its public financing. Events DC trained and referred 719 District residents to Marriott, while 178 were hired by the hotel, which did not meet the local staffing requirement.

In June 2016, former convention center employees filed suit against Events DC for unpaid wages. They allegedly worked overtime on various tasks but were denied comp time.

Nationals Park

Nationals Park, which opened in 2008, is managed by Events DC and built almost entirely with taxpayer funding. In 2016, O'Dell announced that $160 million was needed for upgrades and repairs to the facility.

Wizards and Mystics facility

In 2016, it was announced that Events DC would play a prominent role in the $55 million construction of an arena on the site of St. Elizabeths Hospital that would serve as a practice facility for the Washington Wizards and the new home venue for the Washington Mystics. Members of the DC Council sought to introduce legislation capping public expenditure in the case of cost overruns. On July 28, O'Dell requested an additional $10 million in funding while decreasing the number of seats in the facility. He said earlier estimates were premature. In 2018, O'Dell announced that the cost had increased to $68.8 million, due in part to additions like drywall, and catwalks and higher than anticipated costs like contractors.

O'Dell boasted about the number of local business used in the construction of the facility, but could not provide a list of any of the businesses. Local businesses reported that they were unable to find work at the site. Events DC significantly underestimated the costs of operating the facility and in 2019 the Events DC board approved more than $1 million in additional costs.

Carnegie Library
In 2014, Events DC twice sought to move the International Spy Museum into the Carnegie Library of Washington D.C., but failed to win historic preservation approval. In December 2016, Events DC announced an agreement with Apple to turn the library into a new store for the company, designed by Foster and Partners.

Esports
In 2018, Events DC announced a partnership with Red Bull intended to capitalize on the growing esports market. It was later revealed that Events DC chairman Max Brown had extensive ties with the industry as an investor and lobbyist.

Events DC is also the main jersey sponsor of the Overwatch League's Washington Justice.

Community services
In December 2009, Events DC, then known as WCSA, was criticized for quoting a usage fee of $77,000 to a nonprofit organization, Remote Area Medical, who wished to use the D.C. Armory to host free health clinics.

References

External links
Official website

Companies based in Washington, D.C.
Quasi-public entities in the United States
Entertainment companies established in 2009
2009 establishments in Washington, D.C.
Organizations based in Washington, D.C.
Public benefit corporations based in the United States